It's in the Bag is a 1936 British comedy film directed by William Beaudine and starring Jimmy Nervo, Teddy Knox and Jack Barty.  It was made at Teddington Studios by the British subsidiary of Warner Brothers. Art direction was by Peter Proud.

Plot summary
Two low-level workers acquire some money and decide to open a nightclub together.

Cast
 Jimmy Nervo as Jimmy
 Teddy Knox as Teddy
 Jack Barty as Bert
 George Carney as Blumfield
 Rene Hunter as Ethel
 Ursula Hirst as Vi
 Aubrey Dexter as Peters
 Hal Gordon as Boss
 Ernest Sefton as Jerry Gee
 C. Denier Warren as Emery
 Glen Alyn as Fifi

References

Bibliography
 Low, Rachael. Filmmaking in 1930s Britain. George Allen & Unwin, 1985.
 Marshall, Wendy L. William Beaudine: from silents to television. Scarecrow Press, 2005.
 Wood, Linda. British Films, 1927-1939. British Film Institute, 1986.

External links
 
 
 

1936 films
Films shot at Teddington Studios
Warner Bros. films
1936 comedy films
1930s English-language films
British comedy films
Films directed by William Beaudine
British black-and-white films
1930s British films